Rod Bockenfeld is an American politician who is a member of the Colorado House of Representatives from the 56th District, which encompasses portions of Arapahoe and Adams counties, including the communities of Aurora, Bennett, Brick Center, Brighton, Byers, Comanche Creek, Commerce City, Deer Trail, Lochbuie, Peoria, Strasburg, Thornton, Todd Creek, and Watkins.

Early life and education
A 1974 graduate of Notre Dame High School, a private Catholic school in Quincy, Illinois, Bockenfeld went on to attend Western Illinois University, from which he graduated in 1978 with a B.S. in law enforcement administration. He later graduated from the University of Colorado graduate school of banking.

Political career

In 2004, Bockenfeld was elected Arapahoe County Commissioner, a post he held for 12 years. He was also chairman of the Board of County Commissioners.

Elections
After defeating the incumbent Philip Covarrubias in the primaries, Bockenfeld was elected in the general election on November 6, 2018, winning 56 percent of the vote over 41 percent of Democratic candidate Dave Rose.

In the 2020 Colorado House of Representatives election, Bockenfeld defeated his Democratic Party and Libertarian Party opponents, winning 35,520 votes. Democrat Giugi Carminati won 23,790 votes and Libertarian Kevin Gulbranson won 2,531 votes.

In the 2022 Colorado House of Representatives election, Bockenfeld defeated his Democratic Party and Libertarian Party opponents, winning 75.83% of the total votes cast.

Personal life
He currently lives in Watkins, Colorado with his wife Susan. He has five children and four grandchildren.

References

External links
Legislative website

Year of birth missing (living people)
Living people
21st-century American politicians
Bockenfeld, Rod
People from Arapahoe County, Colorado
People from Quincy, Illinois
University of Colorado alumni
Western Illinois University alumni
County commissioners in Colorado